Neopachylopus is a genus of clown beetles in the family Histeridae. There are about six described species in Neopachylopus.

Species
These six species belong to the genus Neopachylopus:
 Neopachylopus aeneipunctatus (Horn, 1871)
 Neopachylopus kochi Thérond, 1963
 Neopachylopus lepidulus (Broun, 1881)
 Neopachylopus pakistanicus Lackner, 2002
 Neopachylopus secqi Kanaar, 1998
 Neopachylopus sulcifrons (Mannerheim, 1843)

References

Further reading

External links

 

Histeridae
Articles created by Qbugbot